Vezhen is a peak in the Central Balkan Mountains, located in western Bulgaria. At  Vezhen is the 77th highest mountain in Bulgaria. It is situated in the Teteven mountain, firming part of Central Balkan National Park. Its slopes mark the border of the Tsarichina Reserve. Around the peak's area is located the largest forests of Pinus peuce in the Balkan Mountains.

Gallery

Mountains of Bulgaria
Balkan mountains
Two-thousanders of Bulgaria
Landforms of Lovech Province